Konstantin Igorevich Gavrin (born 29 July 1987) is a Russian former pair skater. With partner Elizaveta Levshina, he placed ninth at the 2007 World Junior Championships. They won two medals on the ISU Junior Grand Prix circuit and qualified for the 2005 ISU Junior Grand Prix Final.

Programs 
(with Levshina)

Results 
(with Levshina)

References

External links
 

Russian male pair skaters
1987 births
Living people
Sportspeople from Kirov, Kirov Oblast